San Barnaba may refer to:

 San Barnaba, Milan, a church in Milan, Italy, the first edifice of the Barnabite order
 San Barnaba, Brescia, a church in Brescia, Italy
 San Barnaba, Florence, a church in Florence, Italy
 San Barnaba, Mantua, a church in Mantua, Italy
 San Barnaba, Modena, a church in Modena, Italy
 San Barnaba, Venice, a church in Venice, Italy

See also
 Saint Barnabas (disambiguation)